The Wuzhen Theatre Festival is an annual theatre festival held in Wuzhen, Zhejiang, China. It is jointly sponsored by Stan Lai, Chen Xianghong, Meng Jinghui and Huang Lei, and hosted by Culture Wuhan Co., Ltd. The festival includes units of Specially Invited Plays, Youth Theatre Artists Competition, Outdoor Carnival, and Wuzhen Dialogues.

Introduction 
Wuzhen, located in Tongxiang, Jiaxing City, Zhejiang Province, is the hinterland of the Hangjiahu Plain and belongs to the Taihu Lake Basin. On May 9th, 2013, Wuzhen held the first theatre festival.

Unit 
The festival is held at the Youth Theatre People's Theatre Arena. It is composed of artists from all over the world who love street performances and perform street performance art forms. It includes several major sections, such as drama workshop, drama forum, and exhibition. It is the dialogue channel between the creators and audiences of Wuzhen Theatre Festival. Select world theatre plays are invited to Wuzhen to give performances at different theatres.

Past Review

The first festival 
The first Wuzhen Theatre Festival was divided into three units: "Youth Theater Artists Competition", "Specially Invited Plays" and "Outdoor Carnival". The festival was sponsored by Stan Lai, Huang Lei, Meng Jinghui and Chen Xianghong.

The Youth Theatre Artists Competition unit publicly solicited candidate plays from the drama enthusiasts and performed during the festival. Finally, the jury selected the top three of the Youth Competitions. It awarded Chen Danlu the "Best individual performance award," and awarded Baba Mom the "Best drama award."

The "Shortlisted repertoire" included "One Person’s Red Woolen Blanket," "Reflection," "Reflection Lake," "Untitled," "Virtuous He Luxi," "Time Machine," "One or the Other," "Darkness," "Wrong Words," "Toy Patient," "Baba Mom," and "Utopia Town."

The ancient town carnival event included more than 120 art performance groups around the world, who took the stage at Wuzhen Xizha and performed more than 500 plays.

The second festival 
The Second Wuzhen Theatre Festival's theme was “Metamorphoses”. It was sponsored by Stan Lai, Huang Lei, Meng Jinghui, and Chen Xianghong. The second Wuzhen Theatre Festival was consisted of the units of “Outdoor Carnival”,“Specially Invited Plays”and“Youth Theatre Artists Competition”.

The "Shortlisted repertoire" included Determined Tin Soldier, Grandpa's Adventures, On the Self-growth of a Half-orc, The Kidnapping, The Silence of Urban Dream Walkers, Monsters, West, If Leave, Vienna • Spring Sacrifices, Mountain House, Circular Door, and Original Initial.

The third festival
The Third Wuzhen Theatre Festival's theme was "Transmittal", and was divided into four units:“ Wuzhen Dialogues”,“Youth Theatre Artists Competition”,“Specially Invited Plays”and“Outdoor Carnival”,sponsored by Stan Lai, Huang Lei, Meng Jinghui,Chen Xianghong,hosted by Culture Wuzhen Co., Ltd.The 3rd Wuzhen Theatre Festival's closing drama was "Amazing Valley"

The Youth Theatre Artists competition resulted in "Static", "Ever Never" winning the Best Drama Award, Li Bo, the actor and screenwriter of "Tracing the Line" winning the Best Individual Performance Award, and "Remembrance Day" winning the Special Concern Award.

The Shortlisted Repertoire included Memorial Day, The Cenotaph, Zuo, Amnesia, Lianmu, Who Is Mad, Tracing the Line, Solo, Ever Never, Prometheus in the Tavern, Come Together, Static. While the Whuzhen Dialogues were a series of lectures.

The fourth festival
The Fourth Wuzhen Theatre Festival's theme was “Gaze Beyond”, and it consisted of four units: “ Wuzhen Dialogues”, “Youth Theater Artists Competition”, “ Specially Invited Plays” and “Outdoor Carnival”, a total of 22 works and 79 performances.

The fifth festival
The Fifth Wuzhen Theatre Festival took "Luminosity" as the theme, meaning "Self-discipline and social commitment, the yin and yang shining in all directions", it was held from October 19 to 29, 2017, 24 invited theatre from 12 countries and regions around the world, a total of 100 plays were performed in Wuzhen.

The shortlisted repertoire included: "Running Away From Home", "One And a Quarter", "Crowd", "Breaking the Sky", "Certain Hypothesis of Sustainable Development", "Temporary Stay in the Woods at a Snowy Night", "The Lost Turtle", "Moon”, "Full", "Killing Rabbit", "Er Yu", "New Platform", "Fade Away", "Normal Development", "Xuniang’s Dream", "Moon Tide", "Muchui" "Summer Evening"

The sixth festival
The Sixth Wuzhen Theatre Festival's theme was “Magnanimity”. It was held from October 18th to 28th, 2018. 27+6 Specially Invited Plays from 17 countries and regions in the world performed in Wuzhen. There are four main units: Specially Invited Plays, Young Theatre Artists Competition, Outdoor Carnival, Wuzhen Dialogues.  

The shortlisted repertoire included: "A bad arhat kills a fisherman","Mournful birds cry","Independent people whizzby","Sleeping beauty wakes from a dream","Desperado","Little ants fly","Natural Death interpreted","Fragile diet-coke","Far away lies a beach","Unbridled","Fault-tolerant computing","Thank you dear ms.Xie wanting","Go away","Life on a banch keeps rolling","Dark nights do not slepp","Mystic river","The crazy parrot dances","Nearby,ripples plop".

The specially invited plays were: 19.14 written and directed by Alexander Molochnikov; Dancer in the Dark written by Patrick Ellsworth based on the film by Lars von Trier, and directed by Bastian Kraft; Springtime in the North written and directed by Tadashi Suzuki; and Jeden Gest (One Gesture) written and directed by Wojtek Ziemilski and Wojtek Pustoła

Award Record 
November 2017,the 2nd Boao International Tourism Communication Forum Tourism Communication Awards TC Award "Annual Tourism Marketing Activity List"

January 2018, Chinese cultural figures in 2017, Huang Lei, Stan Lai, Chen Xianghong, Meng Jinghui's "Wuzhen Theater Festival Founder Team"

Shortlisted Works of Past Terms of Competition

Other

Venue Theatre 
Chinese name: Wuzhen Theatre Festival,

Organizer: Culture Wuzhen Co., Ltd.

Location: Wuzhen, Tongxiang City, Jiaxing City, Zhejiang Province

Sponsor: Huang Lei, Meng Jinghui, Stan Lai, Chen Xianghong

Presidium 
Founder and Artistic Director:Meng Jinghui

Founder and Festival Chairman:Chen Xianghong

Founder and Festival Director:Stan Lai

Founder and Producing Director:Huang Lei

Executive Director:Nai-Chu Ding

Managing Director:Chen Yu

Artistic Committee 
He Jiong, Liu Heng, Li Liqun, Pu Cunxin, Sun Honglei, Xi Meijuan, Yu Hua, Yuan Quan

Competition Jury 
Ding Naizheng, Yang Ting, Li Bo, Wu Bi, Stan Lai, Huang Lei, Shi Hang, Tian Qinxin, Zhou Liming

References 

Culture in Zhejiang
Theatre festivals in Asia
Cultural festivals in China